Boris is a tiny lunar impact crater that is located on the Mare Imbrium, to the northeast of the crater Delisle. It lies near the southwest extremity of a sinuous rille that is designated Rima Delisle. This rille meanders to the northeast, towards the crater Heis, before vanishing into the lunar mare. The name Boris is a common Russian male given name; the crater is not named after a specific person.

See also
Borya (crater) - a crater named after the diminutive form of Boris

References

External links
 Map of the region

Impact craters on the Moon
Mare Imbrium